Abul Hasnat Mohammad Khairul Bashar is a Major General of Bangladesh Army. He has been appointed ambassador and his job has been assigned to the Ministry of Foreign Affairs (Bangladesh). Prior to this appointment, he was the GOC of the 17th Infantry Division and Area Commander of Sylhet Area. He served as additional director general of Border Guards Bangladesh.

Career
Bashar was the Additional Director General of Bangladesh Border Guards in 2015. He served under Director General General Aziz Ahmed. According to a 2021 investigation by Al-Jazeera, titled "All the Prime Minister’s Men", Bashar helped his former commander, General Aziz Ahmed, forge identity papers for his fugitive brother, Haris Ahmed. This had been refuted by the Government of Bangladesh.

Bashar was Senior Directing Staff (Army-3) of National Defence College.

References

Living people
Bangladesh Army generals
Year of birth missing (living people)
National Defence College (Bangladesh) alumni